Doron Rubin (1944 – 20 January 2018) was an Israeli general. He was  head of the Israeli Defense Forces' Instruction and Doctrine Directorate and commander of the headquarters for special operations.

Military career
Doron Rubin was drafted into the Israeli Defense Forces in 1963. He volunteered as a paratrooper in the Paratroopers Brigade. He served as a soldier and a squad leader. In 1964 he became an infantry officer after completing Officer Candidate School and returned to the Paratroopers Brigade as a platoon leader.

In the Six-Day War he served as a company commander in the Brigade's 890 battalion and fought in the Gaza Strip. Afterwards, during the War of Attrition, he served as the 50 paratroop battalion's executive officer and took part in Operation Rooster 53.

During the Yom Kippur War Rubin commanded the 202 paratroop battalion, and led it through the battles in the Sinai Peninsula. Later on he commanded the Israeli Defense Forces' Officer Candidate School (Bahad 1). His next command was on the 35th Paratroopers Brigade, which he led on a series of raids against terrorists in Lebanon.

In the 1982 Lebanon War he led the 500th Brigade during heavy fighting against Palestine Liberation Organization operatives and the Syrian army. Later on he commanded the 162nd Division. Afterwards, he was appointed as the head of the Israeli Defense Forces' Instruction and Doctrine Directorate and as the commander of the headquarters for special operations. In 1988, he commanded Operation Blue and Brown, a failed operation conducted by Golani Brigade and Flotilla 13 forces against Popular Front for the Liberation of Palestine – General Command camp near Beirut. The failure contributed to Rubin's dismissal from the IDF. During the Gulf War he was in charge of the Israeli Defense Forces' preparations for special operations in Iraq.

He was a candidate in the 1998 Tel Aviv mayoral election, finishing second behind Roni Milo with 25% of the vote.

References

1944 births
2018 deaths
Israeli generals
Israeli Jews
Tel Aviv University alumni
People from Northern District (Israel)
Burials at Kiryat Shaul Cemetery